The Ceylon tiger (Parantica taprobana) is a species of nymphalid butterfly in the Danainae subfamily. It is endemic to Sri Lanka.

References

External links 
Sri Lanka Wild Life Information Database

Parantica
Butterflies of Sri Lanka
Butterflies described in 1865
Taxonomy articles created by Polbot
Endemic fauna of Sri Lanka
Taxa named by Baron Cajetan von Felder
Taxa named by Rudolf Felder